Palghat Rama Bhagavathar (5 June 1888 – 26 May 1957) was an Indian musician.

Early life 
Rama Bhagavathar was born in Mundaya (മുണ്ടായ) village near Shoranur, Palghat, Kerala. His father, Kasturi Ranganathan was a man of modest income. His mother was Alamelu Mangai. He took his early gurukulavasam with Palghat Anantarama Bhagavathar. He also learned music from Carnatic exponents like Maha Vaidyanatha Iyer. Umayalpuram Swaminatha Iyer who was a scion of the great composer Thyagaraja's musical lineage, taught him to learn a number of kritis of Tyagaraja. Maharajapuram Viswanatha Iyer was a fellow student and the two became friends.

Career 
His first Carnatic concert was at the Kalpathy Kasi Viswanatha Swamy Temple and so was his last concert.

He launched the Palghat (Palakkad) edition of the Tyagaraja Aradhana at Kalpathi Ram Dhyana Madom.

Honours and titles 
 Rama Bhagavathar was regularly invited by Maharaja of Mysore Jayachamaraja Wodeyar to his durbar during Dasara for a special performance and honoured him.
 Maharaja and Maharani of Travancore too honoured him.
 Nobel laureate C.V. Raman bestowed on him the title of Gayaka Kesari.

Personal life 
He died in May 1957 in Kalpathi, Kerala. His wife, Rugmani Ammal, died in 1991. The couple had 7 sons and 4 daughters.

References

External links 
http://www.ramabhagavatar.com
 - A song rendered by Rama Bhagavathar

1888 births
1957 deaths
Male Carnatic singers
Carnatic singers
Singers from Kerala
20th-century Indian male singers
20th-century Indian singers
People from Palakkad district